Luk Kin Ming (born 21 April 1996) is a former Hong Kong professional footballer who played as a defender.

Club career
On 12 August 2019, Luk signed a professional contract with Rangers, moving up to the Hong Kong Premier League with the club.

On 2 July 2020, Luk signed with Kitchee, returning to the club where he was developed.

On 9 April 2021, Luk along with Peng both terminated their contracts with Kitchee due to personal reasons.

References

External links

Luk Kin Ming at HKFA

1996 births
Living people
Hong Kong footballers
Association football defenders
Hong Kong Rangers FC players
Kitchee SC players
Hong Kong Premier League players
Hong Kong First Division League players
Alumni of the University of Hong Kong